Mark Judge may refer to:

 Mark Judge (architect) (1847–1927), British architect and civil engineer
 Mark Judge (writer) (born 1964), American author and journalist